VUHL is a manufacturer of high performance automobiles, headquartered in Mexico. The company was founded by brothers Guillermo and Iker Echeverria.

Products
The company's only product to date is the VUHL 05, a road-legal lightweight supercar. The cars can be purchased in the U.K. through the dealer Bespoke Performance.

According to the company's website, VUHL stands for "Vehicles of Ultra-Lightweight and High Performance".

See also 
DINA S.A.
Mastretta
Cars in Mexico

References

External links

Car manufacturers of Mexico
Sports car manufacturers